Pat Conroy Southern Book Prize (formerly the SEBA Book Award and SIBA Book Award) is an  literary award given by the Southern Independent Booksellers Alliance (SIBA). It was first awarded in 1999. Nominated books must be southern in nature or by a southern author, have been published the previous year, and have been nominated by a SIBA-member bookstore or one of their customers. Voting categories include fiction,  Nonfiction, poetry, cooking and children's literature.

The first awards were given in 1999. From 1999 through 2007 winners were chosen by popular vote through an online voting mechanism. Starting in 2008, winners were chosen from the list of finalists by a jury of SIBA booksellers. Beginning in 2016, the award was renamed the Southern Book Award and named in honor of southern writer Pat Conroy.

Winners

Southern Book Prize

Pat Conroy Southern Book Prize

References

External links
SIBA Book Award, official website
SIBA Book Award at LibraryThing

American children's literary awards
Southern United States literature
American fiction awards
American non-fiction literary awards
American poetry awards
Awards established in 1999
1999 establishments in the United States